The 1960 Paris–Nice was the 18th edition of the Paris–Nice cycle race and was held from 9 March to 16 March 1960. The race started in Paris and finished in Nice. The race was won by Raymond Impanis of the Faema team.

General classification

References

1960
1960 in road cycling
1960 in French sport
March 1960 sports events in Europe
1960 Super Prestige Pernod